ArDarius Stewart (born December 8, 1993) is a professional gridiron football wide receiver who is a free agent. He played college football at Alabama, and was drafted by the New York Jets in the third round of the 2017 NFL Draft.

Early years
Stewart attended Fultondale High School in Fultondale, Alabama, a suburb outside of Birmingham, where he played on the Wildcats football team. He played quarterback, running back, and wide receiver in high school. Stewart committed to the University of Alabama to play college football under head coach Nick Saban.

College career
After redshirting his first year at Alabama in 2013, Stewart played in 13 games with two starts in 2014 and recorded 12 receptions for 149 yards. As a sophomore in 2015, he played in all 15 games, recording 63 receptions for 700 yards and four touchdowns. As a junior, he had 54 receptions for 864 yards and nine touchdowns. After the season, Stewart decided to forgo his senior year and enter the 2017 NFL Draft.

Professional career

New York Jets
Stewart was drafted by the New York Jets in the third round (79th overall) of the 2017 NFL Draft. On May 25, 2017, Stewart signed a four-year deal with the Jets worth $3.25 million.

On September 10, 2017, Stewart made his NFL debut. He had two receptions for 10 yards in the 21–12 loss to the Buffalo Bills. Overall, in his rookie season, he finished with six receptions for 82 receiving yards in 15 games.

On July 27, 2018, Stewart was suspended for the first two games of the 2018 regular season for violating the NFL policy on performance-enhancing substances. He was waived by the Jets on September 19, 2018 and was re-signed to the practice squad. He was released on October 5, 2018.

Oakland Raiders
On November 14, 2018, Stewart was signed to the Oakland Raiders practice squad. He was released on November 28, 2018.

Washington Redskins
The Washington Redskins signed Stewart to their practice squad on December 26, 2018. He signed a reserve/future contract with the Redskins on December 31, 2018. The Redskins waived him on January 7, 2019.

Winnipeg Blue Bombers
On February 27, 2020, Stewart signed with the Winnipeg Blue Bombers of the Canadian Football League.

BC Lions
On March 14, 2022, Stewart signed with the BC Lions of the Canadian Football League. He was released on May 30, 2022.

DC Defenders
Stewart was assigned to the DC Defenders of the XFL on January 6, 2023. He was removed from the teams roster on January 23, 2023.

References

External links
 Alabama Crimson Tide bio
 New York Jets bio

1993 births
Living people
Alabama Crimson Tide football players
American football wide receivers
DC Defenders players
New York Jets players
Oakland Raiders players
People from Jefferson County, Alabama
Players of American football from Alabama
Washington Redskins players